The Song of Sway Lake is a 2018 American romantic drama film directed by Ari Gold and starring Rory Culkin, Robert Sheehan, Isabelle McNally, Mary Beth Peil, Elizabeth Peña and Jack Falahee.

Cast
 Rory Culkin as Ollie.
 Robert Sheehan as Nikolai.
 Isabelle McNally as Isadora.
 Mary Beth Peil as Charlie Sway.
 Elizabeth Peña as Marlena.
 Jack Falahee as Jimmy.
 Brian Dennehy as Hal Sway.
 Anna Shields as Heather.
 Jason Brill as Timmy Sway

Reception
The film has  rating on Rotten Tomatoes. The site's critical consensus reads, "The Song of Sway Lake benefits from alluring, evocative atmosphere, although it isn't always enough to compensate for a shaggy narrative and overall lack of focus."  Glenn Kenny of RogerEbert.com awarded the film two stars.  Derek Smith of Slant Magazine awarded the film two stars out of four.

References

External links

 
 
 

2018 films
2018 romantic drama films
2010s English-language films
American romantic drama films
Films about friendship
Films set in the United States
Films set on farms
Films set in forests
Films set in 2018
2010s American films